United Writers' Association is a literary organisation based in India which was founded by Dr. K Thiagarajan almost 33 years ago at Chennai in India.The organisation hosts the distinguished Frank Moraes Memorial Lectures

References

External links
Official Website 
 
 http://www.ugc.ac.in/more/frankmoraes_chennai.html

Writers' organizations
Cultural organisations based in India